Gościno (formerly )  is a small town in Kołobrzeg County, West Pomeranian Voivodeship, in north-western Poland. It is the seat of the gmina (administrative district) called Gmina Gościno.

The town has a population of 2,332.

History

The earliest documentation of the village of Gościno appears in the year 1238 as a property of the Knights of St. John of Jerusalem. The town's name derives from the Old Polish male name Gościmir. A main tourist site in Gościno, the Church of St. Andrew Bobola, houses a cup-shaped baptismal font hewn from one Gotland limestone boulder, from the 12th and 13th centuries. It is one of the few sacred relics of this kind in Western Pomerania.

During earlier centuries the settlement had been a domain owned and farmed out by the town of Kołobrzeg. It had been bought by the town's magistrate in the 14th century from the abbot of Doberan Abbey. Around 1780 the domain included 16 farm houses.

From the 18th century the village was part of the Kingdom of Prussia and from 1871 to 1945 it was also part of Germany, administratively located in the Landkreis Kolberg-Körlin of the Province of Pomerania. After the defeat of Nazi Germany in World War II in 1945 it became part of Poland.

Since 1 January 2011 Gościno has had the status of a town.

Gallery

Notable people 
 Egon Schultz (1943–1964) a German sergeant of the East German Border Troops who became the fifty-second known person to die at the Berlin Wall

See also
 Landkreis Kolberg-Körlin

References

External links
List of municipalities in Kolberg-Körlin
A Brief History of Pomerania
 Website der Gemeinde (BIP) (Polish)
 Webseite mit Informationen über das Dorf (German)

Cities and towns in West Pomeranian Voivodeship
Kołobrzeg County